Pehrest or Pehrost or Pahrost or Pahrast or Pohrost may refer to:
 Pehrest-e Olya
 Pehrest-e Sofla